Abou Bakr Ali Al-Mel (born 15 November 1992), also known as Bako, is a Lebanese professional footballer who plays as a forward for  club Sagesse.

Club career

Nejmeh
Abou Bakr made his debut in Lebanese Premier League with Nejmeh SC in 2011 as an 18-year-old and made five appearances with his came on 30 December 2011 in the match where Al-Safa' SC against Nejmeh SC when he was substituted in to replace Hassan Al Mohamed on minute 85, and able to make 5 appearances as a substitute for the club and had 38 minutes of play.

Egtmaaey
Abou Bakr signed for Al Egtmaaey Tripoli for the 2012–13 season. On 19 March 2013 he scored his first goal in his career and for Al-Shabab in a 5–3 win over Shabab Al-Ghazieh. He had 770 minutes played after had played 17 matches where he had 6 appearances as first eleven.

Salam Zgharta

2013–14 season
Abou Bakr joined Salam Zgharta for 2013–14 season and made his debut against his former club, Nejmeh SC where they lost 0-2. He scored his first goal for the club on 2 November 2013 against Racing Beirut. On 14 November 2013, he scored two goal against his former club, Al Egtmaaey Tripoli which is the first time he scored twice in a match in his career. He also started to make more appearances as the first eleven as he made 20 appearances where 19 of them is as the first eleven. He is also one of the Lebanese FA Cup winning squad on that year as Salam Zgharta won 1-0 after extra time on 31 May 2014.

2014–15 season 
He stayed at Salam Zgharta for 2014-15 season to make it his first club where he played for two seasons straight. His first season this season came on 23 November 2014 against Al-Nabi Shayth F.C. He make 15 appearances with 5 goals for this season. For winning the Lebanese FA Cup in the previous season, Salam Zgharta was given the chance to compete in AFC Cup which will be his and the club inaugural season competing in the cup. His debut in AFC Cup came on 17 February 2015 in 2015 AFC Cup qualifying play-off against Tajikistan club, Khayr Vahdat FK where they won 3-0 and qualified to the group stage. His first goal in the AFC Cup was during the match against Al-Nahda Club, an Oman based club where he scored twice to make a 2–1 win. Their journey in the 2015 AFC Cup came to an end after placed in 4th position with only 3 points after only 1 match won from 6 matches.

Tripoli

2015–16 season 
After making 35 appearances and 9 goals with Salam Zgharta, he signed with Tripoli SC and his debut came on 16 October 2015 against Al-Ansar SC. He scored his first goal for the club on 1 November 2015 against Al-Safa' SC. As Tripoli SC was the Lebanese FA Cup champion for 2014–15 Lebanese FA Cup, he get another chance in the AFC Cup where he get to scored two goals also in this campaign but still failed to pass the group stage after Tripoli only placed 3rd in group

2016–17 season 
2016-17 was a great season for Abou Bakr as he was named as Lebanese Premier League top scorer as he scored 16 goals.

Kelantan
On 18 May 2017, Abou Bakr joined Liga Super side, Kelantan on a one and a half year contract that will end in November 2018. He was signed to replace his fellow countryman, Mohammed Ghaddar. This was also the first time in his career for him to expatriate from Lebanon to play at foreign country. It was also revealed he had rejected a trial offer from West Ham United and an offer from Saudi Arabia based club to joined Kelantan. He made his debut on 24 May 2017, playing against Penang.

PSIS Semarang
Abou Bakr signed for Indonesian side PSIS Semarang in the 2018 Liga 1. He made his first team debut on 30 July 2018 in a 1–1 2018 Liga 1 home draw against PSM Makassar, replacing Bayu Nugroho after 56 minutes and assisting Hari Nur Yulianto's goal.

Return to Nejmeh 
On 10 September 2018, Bako returned to Lebanon, signing for Nejmeh. In his debut game in the league, 21 September 2018, he scored a goal against Ansar in a 4–2 domestic win. On 29 January he scored a brace in the Lebanese FA Cup Round of 16 game against Takadom Ankoun in a 6–0 win.

Bako was chosen as the best player of the season by a public referendum held by Football Lebanon.

Bourj 
On 8 September 2020, Bako joined Bourj on a permanent deal. He played seven games, scoring two goals and making one assist in the first half of the 2020–21 Lebanese Premier League.

UiTM 
In December 2020 Bako moved back to Malaysia, joining UiTM ahead of the 2021 Malaysia Super League. He made his debut on 6 March 2021, losing 2–1 in the first matchday against Terengganu.

Return to Bourj 
On 22 May 2021, Bako returned to Bourj. He helped his side win the 2021 Lebanese Challenge Cup as the competition's top goalscorer, with three goals.

Sagesse 
On 4 July 2022, Bako moved to Sagesse, alongside Bourj teammate Akram Moghrabi.

International career
Bako first appearance for Lebanon came on 5 February 2016, as a substitute in a friendly against Bahrain.

Career statistics

Club

Honours
Salam Zgharta
 Lebanese FA Cup: 2013–14

Bourj
 Lebanese Challenge Cup: 2021

Individual
 Lebanese Premier League Team of the Season: 2016–17
 Lebanese Premier League Best Goal: 2013–14
 Lebanese Premier League top scorer: 2016-17
 Lebanese Challenge Cup top scorer: 2021

Notes

References

External links

 
 
 
 

1992 births
Living people
Sportspeople from Tripoli, Lebanon
Lebanese footballers
Association football forwards
Nejmeh SC players
Al Egtmaaey SC players
Salam Zgharta FC players
AC Tripoli players
Kelantan FA players
PSIS Semarang players
Bourj FC players
UiTM FC players
Sagesse SC footballers
Lebanese Premier League players
Malaysia Super League players
Liga 1 (Indonesia) players
Lebanese expatriate footballers
Lebanese expatriate sportspeople in Malaysia
Lebanese expatriate sportspeople in Indonesia
Expatriate footballers in Malaysia
Expatriate footballers in Indonesia
Lebanon international footballers
Lebanese Premier League top scorers